Nicky Horne (born 3 September 1950) is an English DJ, who has worked for a variety of radio stations, including Capital Radio.

Career 
Horne worked as a road manager for Emperor Rosko in 1969, before presenting shows on BBC Radio 1, from 1970 to 1973.

Horne was one of the original line-up on London's Capital Radio, where he presented shows such as Your Mother Wouldn't like it, Mummy's Weekly & 6 of the Best.  He remained on Capital Radio until 1988, and also sat in for Alan Freeman presenting Pick of the Pops Take 2 in 1986.

He covered American football with Miles Aiken in the 1980s.

Since then, he re-joined Radio 1 in the early 1990s where he was a stand-in presenter and at the same time, he presented a weekend afternoon show on Classic FM. He also worked on the UK commercial radio overnight sustaining service, The Superstation.

His TV career has included presenting American Football on Channel 4, Rock Steady, and Earsay also on Channel 4, American Football, and NBA for Sky Sports, and for many years was the presenter of ATP tennis, and Davis Cup worldwide.

Horne joined Virgin Radio in 1995. He took over the drivetime show from the sacked Nick Abbot and two weekend shows as well.  In 1997, he took on the weekday afternoon show from 14pm, before leaving the station in 1998.

In 1998 Horne joined BBC Radio 2, presenting the weekend overnight show (Fridays/Saturdays 12 midnight3am and Saturdays/Sundays 14am), before his shows were taken over by Lynn Parsons in 1999.

At the beginning of 2003, Horne replaced Charles Nove on the drivetime show on London's Jazz FM, later moving to mid-mornings until mid-2005, From then on, he was heard on Capital Gold every Sunday afternoon fronting a Classic Album Show. He worked at the digital radio station Planet Rock as the weekday evening presenter until 17 May 2013. He then left to join TeamRock Radio, starting as the evening presenter (69pm) in June. In February 2021 Nicky Horne began presenting a new weekday afternoon show for Boom Radio.

References

External links
Nicky Horne on Boom Radio

British radio personalities
Virgin Radio (UK)
British radio DJs
BBC Radio 2 presenters
Living people
National Football League announcers
National Basketball Association broadcasters
Tennis commentators
1950 births
Place of birth missing (living people)